Melaka Crocodile Farm, officially Melaka Crocodile and Recreational Park is a crocodile farm in Ayer Keroh, Malacca, Malaysia, which was established in July 1987. It is the largest crocodile farm in Malaysia, expands over an area of 3.5 hectares of reserved forest land. The farm's entrance gate was built like a mini fort with a flight of steps leading inside. It consists of several attractions, namely the main crocodile farm, reptile corner, mammal house, walkthrough aviary, water park, Malaysia miniature, petting zoo, haunted house and herb's garden.

Shows
4 types of shows:
Cultural Dances Show
Crocodile Interactive Show
Magic Show
Crocodile feeding demonstration
The farm features live crocodile shows every weekends or public and school holidays.

See also
 List of tourist attractions in Malacca

References

External links
 

1987 establishments in Malaysia
Ayer Keroh
Buildings and structures in Malacca
Crocodile farms in Malaysia
Tourist attractions in Malacca
Zoos established in 1987